Bramhope is a civil parish in the metropolitan borough of the City of Leeds, West Yorkshire, England.  It contains 20 listed buildings that are recorded in the National Heritage List for England.  Of these, one is listed at Grade I, the highest of the three grades, and the others are at Grade II, the lowest grade.  The parish contains the village of Bramhope and the surrounding countryside.  Of the listed buildings, nine are mileposts, and the others include houses, farmhouses and farm buildings, a chapel and a church, the north portal of Bramhope Tunnel and a sighting tower used in the construction of the tunnel, and a gazebo.


Key

Buildings

References

Citations

Sources

 

Lists of listed buildings in West Yorkshire